The 2011 Campeonato Ecuatoriano de Fútbol de la Serie A (known as the 2011 Copa Credife Serie A for sponsorship reasons) was the 53rd season of the Serie A, Ecuador's premier football league. The season began on January 30 and ended on December 18, with a break in July for the 2011 Copa América. LDU Quito is the defending champion.

Format
After a session of the preliminary meeting of the Congress of Professional Football of the Ecuadorian Football Federation, it was determined that the format for the 2011 season will be the same as the previous season.

Teams
Twelve teams will compete in the 2011 Serie A season, ten of whom remain from the previous season. Macará and Universidad Católica were relegated last season after accumulating the fewest points in the 2010 season aggregate table. They were replaced by LDU Loja and Imbabura, the 2010 Serie B winner and runner-up, respectively. This will be both clubs' second season in the league. LDU Loja played their only season in 2005 and Imbabura played their only season in 2007.

Managerial changes

First stage
The first stage began on January 30 and ended on June 19.  Emelec won the stage.

Standings

Results

Second stage
The second stage began on July 22 and is scheduled to end on December 4.

Standings

Results

Aggregate table

Third stage
The Third Stage began on December 11 and will end on December 19. It will consist of two playoffs.

Third-place playoffs
LDU Quito and El Nacional will play in the third-place playoff for the Ecuador 3 berth in the 2012 Copa Libertadores as the top-two teams non-stage winners in the aggregate table. Since LDU Quito had the most points in the aggregate table, they will play the second leg at home.

Finals
Emelec and Deportivo Quito qualified to the Finals by being the First Stage and Second Stage winners, respectively. The winner will be the Serie A champion and earned the Ecuador 1 berth in the 2012 Copa Libertadores. By having the greater number of points in the aggregate table, Deportivo Quito will play the second leg at home.

Top goalscorers

Updated as of games played on December 4, 2011.Source:

Hat-tricks

5 Player scored 5 goals.

References

External links
Official website 

Ecuadorian Serie A seasons
Ecu
Serie A